Jens Østerholm (25 April 1928 – 13 November 2006) was a Danish film actor. He appeared in 27 films between 1959 and 1994. He was born in Denmark and was married to actress Birgitte Federspiel, but the couple divorced.

Selected filmography
 Gøngehøvdingen (1961)
 Dronningens vagtmester (1963)
 To (1964)
 My Sisters Children Go Astray (1971)
 Me, Too, in the Mafia (1974)

External links

1928 births
2006 deaths
Danish male film actors
People from Glostrup Municipality
Place of death missing